Baso Liben is one of the woredas in the Amhara Region of Ethiopia. A triangular-shaped district at the southernmost point of the Misraq Gojjam Zone, Baso Liben is bordered on the south by a bend of the Blue Nile river which separates it from the Oromia Region, on the northwest by the Chamwaga river which separates it from Gozamn, and on the northeast by Aneded. The major town in Baso Liben is Yejube.

Rivers in Baso Liben include the Yada, and the Sens which is a tributary of the Chamwaga. Several fords have been used since time immemorial to cross the Blue Nile from Baso Liben into the Guduru and Cheliya woredas in the Oromia Region, which are, in order flowing downriver: the Balanti, Malka, Malka Kuki, Malka Fursi, and Malka Yekatel.

Demographics
Based on the 2007 national census conducted by the Central Statistical Agency of Ethiopia (CSA), the woreda has a total population of 138,332, an increase of 22.74% from  the 1994 census, of whom 68,034 are men and 70,298 women; 6,439 or 4.65% are urban inhabitants. With an area of 1,118.56 square kilometers, Baso Liben has a population density of 123.67, which is less than the Zones' average of 153.8 persons per square kilometer. A total of 31,760 households were counted in this woreda, resulting in an average of 4.36 persons to a household, and 31,200 housing units. The majority of the inhabitants practiced Ethiopian Orthodox Christianity, with 99.09% reporting that as their religion.

The 1994 national census reported a total population for this woreda of 112,707 in 24,320 households, of whom 56,339 were men and 56,368 were women; 3,747 or 3.32% of its population were urban dwellers. The largest ethnic group reported in Baso Liben was the Amhara (99.91%). The majority of the inhabitants practiced Ethiopian Orthodox Christianity, with 98.59% reporting that as their religion, while 1.33% were Muslim. However, Charles Beke, who travelled through this area in 1842, states that groups of Oromos had settled in this part of Gojjam, the names of their tribes becoming the names of these districts.

Economy

The woreda is known for its abundant production of different agricultural products (cereals) including wheat, teff, maize, barley and sesame (in the Kola part of the woreda). it is one of the woredas in the zone with surplus production of wheat and teff which are the main trading activities in the area. Many traders collect these commodities from the farmers, sell to the big markets and purchase other consumer products like cloth for the society. Apart from agriculture and trading there are small industrial activity, industrial products include floor, plastic and small scale iron work. The only service sector economy in the woreda are Transand and small hotels.

Notes

Districts of Amhara Region